Nijolė Sadūnaitė (born 22 July 1938, in Kaunas) is a clandestine Lithuanian Catholic nun of the Soviet period who worked with the Chronicle of the Catholic Church in Lithuania. In 1975 she faced three years of imprisonment for her efforts. She spent time imprisoned in the Mordavia and then in Boguchany. She reportedly faced a variety of abuses in this period, including torture. She wrote A Radiance in the Gulag about her experiences.

In 2018, Sadūnaitė received the 'Lithuanian Freedom Award". She is the first female in history to receive the award.

References

External links 
 LITHUANIANS RALLY FOR STALIN VICTIMS  (By BILL KELLER,  August 24, 1987, New York Times)
 Lithuania Rights Unit Protests to Gorbachev (New York Times)

1938 births
20th-century Roman Catholic nuns
20th-century Lithuanian women writers
21st-century Roman Catholic nuns
Lithuanian anti-communists
Lithuanian Roman Catholics
Living people
People from Kaunas
Soviet dissidents
Grand Crosses of the Order of Vytautas the Great
Prisoners and detainees of the Soviet Union